Arshia Babazadeh (born 5 November 1995) is an Iranian professional footballer.

Career

Youth
Babazadeh joined the Esteghlal academy at the age of 13 years old. In 2014, he moved to the United States and was part of the De Anza Force club team.

Professional
In 2016, Babazadeh returned to Esteghlal and helped the side lift the Hazfi Cup and participated in the AFC Champions League. In 2018, he moved to Thai League 3 side Surat Thani for a season.

2019 saw Babazadeh return to the United States, joining NISA side Philadelphia Fury. He made a single appearance for the club before they folded after one game due to investment issues. He spent the remainder of the season with Los Angeles Force, without making an appearance. 2020 saw Babazadeh stay in the NISA with Michigan Stars, where he made two regular season appearances.

On 5 May 2021, Babazadeh signed with USL Championship side Austin Bold. He made his debut for Austin on 20 October 2021, starting in a 3–0 loss to El Paso Locomotive.

References

External links
 NISA bio
 Austin Bold bio

1995 births
Living people
Association football goalkeepers
Esteghlal F.C. players
Arshia Babazadeh
Austin Bold FC players
Expatriate footballers in Thailand
Expatriate soccer players in the United States
Iranian footballers
Iranian expatriate footballers
Iranian expatriate sportspeople in Thailand
Iranian expatriate sportspeople in the United States
Arshia Babazadeh
National Independent Soccer Association players
USL Championship players
De Anza Force players